William Manson (July 4, 1867 – July 24, 1953) was a Scottish-born accountant, notary public and political figure in British Columbia, Canada. He represented Alberni from 1906 to 1907 and Skeena from 1909 to 1915 in the Legislative Assembly of British Columbia as a Conservative.

He was born in the Shetland Islands, the son of William Manson, and was educated there. Manson came to British Columbia in 1887, where he was employed as a clerk in a general store in Comox. In 1893, he married Sarah Louise Bennett. He served as a school trustee and a member of the town council for Nanaimo, serving as the town's mayor from 1901 to 1904. Manson was elected to the assembly in a 1906 by-election held after William Wallace Burns McInnes was named Commissioner of the Yukon. He was a member of the province's Executive Council from 1906 to 1907, serving as Provincial Secretary and Minister of Education. He was defeated by Harlan Carey Brewster when he ran for reelection to the assembly in 1907. He died in 1953.

References

Mayors of Nanaimo
Members of the Executive Council of British Columbia
British Columbia Conservative Party MLAs
1867 births
1953 deaths